Jhang Polytechnic Institute was founded in 1998 for technical education in Jhang District. It is owned by two engineer brothers, Khalil Ahmad and Kashif Tauqeer. The institute offers 3 Years Diploma of Associate Engineering. At first three technologies were introduced: electrics, electronics and computing.

Educational institutions established in 1998
Jhang District